Athanasios Pangouras (born 3 June 1971) is a retired Greek football defender.

References

1971 births
Living people
Greek footballers
Veria F.C. players
Ionikos F.C. players
Apollon Smyrnis F.C. players
Super League Greece players
Association football defenders